Baldwin Township is a township in Sherburne County, Minnesota, United States. The population was 4,672 at the 2000 census.

History
Baldwin Township was organized in 1858, and named for Francis Eugene Baldwin, a county official and afterward state senator.

Geography

Demographics
At the 2000 census, there were 4,672 people, 1,573 households and 1,267 families residing in the township. The racial makeup of the township was 98.37% White, 0.13% African American, 0.26% Native American, 0.24% Asian, 0.17% from other races, and 0.83% from two or more races. Hispanic or Latino of any race were 0.66% of the population.

There were 1,573 households, of which 45.7% had children under the age of 18 living with them, 70.7% were married couples living together, 5.5% had a female householder with no husband present, and 19.4% were non-families. 13.5% of all households were made up of individuals, and 2.5% had someone living alone who was 65 years of age or older. The average household size was 2.97 and the average family size was 3.27.

32.3% of the population were under the age of 18, 7.0% from 18 to 24, 35.5% from 25 to 44, 20.2% from 45 to 64, and 5.0% who were 65 years of age or older. The median age was 32 years. For every 100 females, there were 106.3 males. For every 100 females age 18 and over, there were 109.7 males.

The median household income was $60,607 and the family median income was $62,951. Males had a median income of $41,803 compared with $26,615 for females. The per capita income was $20,798. About 0.5% of families and 2.4% of the population were below the poverty line, including 2.5% of those under age 18 and 4.3% of those age 65 or over.

References

External links
Baldwin Township

Townships in Sherburne County, Minnesota
Townships in Minnesota